Yinshania, (meaning Yinshan shepherd's purse), is a genus of flowering plants in the crucifer family Brassicaceae, native to China (including Taiwan) and northern Vietnam. Species in Yinshania are diploid, and species in a proposed related genus, Hilliella, are polyploid.

Species
Currently accepted species include:

Yinshania acutangula (O.E.Schulz) Y.H.Zhang
Yinshania fumarioides (Dunn) Y.Z.Zhao
Yinshania furcatopilosa (K.C.Kuan) Y.H.Zhang
Yinshania henryi (Oliv.) Y.H.Zhang
Yinshania hui (O.E.Schulz) Y.Z.Zhao
Yinshania hunanensis (Y.H.Zhang) Al-Shehbaz, G.Yang, L.L.Lu & T.Y.Cheo
Yinshania lichuanensis (Y.H.Zhang) Al-Shehbaz, G.Yang, L.L.Lu & T.Y.Cheo
Yinshania paradoxa (Hance) Y.Z.Zhao
Yinshania rivulorum (Dunn) Al-Shehbaz, G.Yang, L.L.Lu & T.Y.Cheo
Yinshania rupicola (D.C.Zhang & J.Z.Shao) Al-Shehbaz, G.Yang, L.L.Lu & T.Y.Cheo
Hilliella rupicola Y.H.Zhang

Yinshania sinuata (K.C.Kuan) Al-Shehbaz, G.Yang, L.L.Lu & T.Y.Cheo
Yinshania yixianensis (Y.H.Zhang) Al-Shehbaz, G.Yang, L.L.Lu & T.Y.Cheo
Yinshania zayuensis Y.H.Zhang

Notes

References 

Brassicaceae
Brassicaceae genera